Parc Astérix is a theme park in France based on the comic book series Asterix by Albert Uderzo and René Goscinny. There are approximately 2.3 million visitors to Parc Astérix each year, making it France's second largest theme park, after Disneyland Paris, which attracts approximately 14 million visitors each year. 

It is especially renowned in France for its large variety of roller coasters; it has begun incorporating rides and themes from historic cultures like the Gauls, the Romans, Ancient Greece and recently Ancient Egypt, but always in the visual style of the societies. Opened in 1989, the park is operated by Compagnie des Alpes.

History

Conception and inauguration

Largely funded by the Barclays financial company, with 20 other investors including Compagnie Générale des Eaux, the Havas group, Union des Assurances de Paris and the Picardy region, the park cost 850 million French francs to build and generated 1,200 jobs. The location was chosen due to the transport network: a private interchange connects it with the nearby A1 autoroute and a bus shuttle service connects it with Paris Métro Line 7. Jack Lang, then Minister of Culture, inaugurated the park on 30 April 1989 after two years of work.

The opening of Disneyland Paris in 1992 caused Parc Astérix's attendance to fall 30% and revenue by 19%. However, attendance soon stabilised to around 2 million visitors per year.

Recent developments
In October 2005, Parc Astérix ran La Fête des Druides ("The Festival of the Druids"), as a way of "thumbing their noses" at Halloween. In 2007, Parc Astérix opened for the first time during the Christmas holidays. In 2009, for the park's 20th anniversary, it opened during the weekends in September and October and ran a Halloween event called Peur sur le Parc Astérix ("Fear at Parc Astérix"). In November 2018, the park announced the construction of Toutatis, a new multi-launch roller coaster manufactured by Intamin, to be opened in 2023. In January 2021, the park announced it was closing its dolphin and sea lion aquarium in order to focus on rides and other shows.

Attractions

There are many attractions and shows including:

Tonnerre 2 Zeus, a large wooden roller coaster, built by Custom Coasters International (1997);
Goudurix, a large steel multi-looping coaster, built by Vekoma (1989);
Trace du Hourra, a 900-metre bobsled roller coaster, with cars that reach 80 km/h (2001);
Romus et Rapidus, a river rapids ride (1989);
OzIris, an inverted roller coaster, built by Bolliger & Mabillard (2012);
Attention Menhir, a 4D cinema show (2019);
L'Oxygénarium, spinning rapids: large, twisting water slide with round inflatable dinghies (1999);
La Galère, a swinging ship ride (1989);
Menhir Express, a Menhir-themed log flume ride with a 13-metre final drop (1995);
Grand Splatch, Shoot the Chute (1989);
Le Défi de César, a Madhouse ride (2008);
Le Delphinarium, one of the largest dolphin enclosures in Europe;
Pégase Express, a launched steel roller coaster that reverses the ride direction after a pause halfway through the ride, built by Gerstlauer (2017).

Economic and Operational Data

Management and Personnel 
The park recruits around 2,000 people for the 2023 season, which is a larger number than in previous years.

Attendance 
In September 2022, Parc Astérix achieves a record attendance of over 2.6 million visitors for the year.

Incidents
 In July 2004, an 11-year-old boy was hit by lightning at the foot of the Tonnerre de Zeus (Zeus' Thunder). The park had continued operating despite weather warnings.
 On 5 July 2006, a 6-year-old Belgian child drowned on the ride La Descente du Styx, sucked in by the water pumps used to create the flow in the bottom of the ride's canal. The ride underwent various security measures; it was renamed to Romus et Rapidus in order to cast off the bad memory and unfortunate implications.

See also

Incidents at European amusement parks

References

External links
 Parc Astérix official website (some parts require Adobe Flash. In French, with some English translations)
 Parc Astérix on rcdb.com

Amusement parks in France
Asterix
Buildings and structures in Oise
Compagnie des Alpes
Tourist attractions in Hauts-de-France
Tourist attractions in Oise
1989 establishments in France
Amusement parks opened in 1989